is a passenger railway station in the city of Chikusei, Ibaraki, Japan, operated by East Japan Railway Company (JR East).

Lines
Tamado Station is served by the Mito Line, and is located 12.5 km from the official starting point of the line at Oyama Station.

Station layout
The station consists of one side platform serving traffic in both directions. The station is staffed.

History
Tamado Station was opened on 20 June 1988.

Passenger statistics
In fiscal 2019, the station was used by an average of 662 passengers daily (boarding passengers only).

Surrounding area
 
Chikusei-Tamado Post Office
Tamado Industrial Estate

See also
 List of railway stations in Japan

References

External links

 JR East Station Information 

Railway stations in Ibaraki Prefecture
Mito Line
Railway stations in Japan opened in 1988
Chikusei